The Beat Club is a techno music group that was founded in the late 1980s by Ony Rodriguez and Mirey Valls in Miami, Florida.

History 
Ony Rodriguez began his career in the late 1980s as a rhythm guitarist and producer with EMI recording group The Voice in Fashion. Even after attaining minor commercial success, Ony Rodriguez decided to pursue his personal interests and style of music more and started the Beat Club. What began as an ongoing “free-form” studio jam with friends led to the international hit “Security”, and his departure from The Voice in Fashion.

Influenced by the likes of the “Miami Bass” movement, New Order and Kraftwerk, Rodriguez's music relied less on his main instrument of the guitar and more on his love for electronics.

Initially on Atlantic Records, The Beat Club was offered the opportunity to become the first recording act to be signed to New Order manager and Manchester’s Factory Record mogul, the late Rob Gretton’s own personal label robsrecords. The Beat Club went on to release several recordings in the UK resulting in the singles “Security” which reached no. 92 in the UK Singles Chart (recorded by, and featuring New Order’s Bernard Sumner), “Dreams Were Made to Be Broken” and “X”.

Upon the expiration of the contract with Atlantic Records, Rodriguez (along with his wife, Mirey Valls) went on to start Electrobeat Records in Miami, Florida. Throughout the 1990s and 2000s, Electrobeat has released over a dozen albums produced by the Beat Club under various pseudonyms including Ony, Fuzzy Logic, Toys for the Revolution, Santa Fe and Urban Select.

Recent activity 
In late 2006, the Beat Club released the album Robotica which included the club singles “Dream Within a Dream” and “Lost in Space”. The first quarter of 2008 saw the release of the new album Minimalista, along with a possible promotional tour in 2009. In 2010, first album Paris was reissued on CD by LTM with new artwork and bonus tracks.

Along with releases on Electrobeat, Atlantic, Rob's Records and ZYX Records, the Beat Club has been featured on various compilations including Champion Records UK, John Digweed's Azuli release and other mixes, in addition to a recent cover version of "Security" by the Freestylers on their album Adventures in Freestyle.

Discography

References

Sources 
 The Beat Club's Official MySpace page. Retrieved on August 8, 2007.
 Electrobeat Official Website Archived 1992–2008 Rodri Publishing (ASCAP)
 Electrobeat Official Website (Interview) Archived 1992–2008 Rodri Publishing (ASCAP)
 Miami New Times article, From December 12, 1995
 Beat Club biography at LTM

External links 
 

Electronic music groups from Florida
Musical groups from Miami
American dance music groups
American electronic music duos